Herod may refer to:

People of the Herodian dynasty
 Herod the Great (born c. 74 BC, ruled 37–4 BC or 1 BC), client king of Judea who expanded the Second Temple in Jerusalem and in the New Testament orders the Massacre of the Innocents
 Herod Archelaus (23 BC–c. AD 18, ruled 4 BC–AD 6), ethnarch of Samaria, Judea, and Idumea
 Herod Antipas (born 21 BC, ruled 4 BC–AD 39), tetrarch of Galilee and Peraea and in the New Testament orders the death of John the Baptist and mocks Jesus
 Philip the Tetrarch or Herod Philip II, (born c. 20 BC, ruled 4 BC–AD 34), tetrarch of Iturea, Trachonitis, and Batanaea
 Herod II or Herod Philip I (c. 27 BC–33 AD), father of the Salome in Mark 6:21-29, did not rule over any territory
 Herod Agrippa (born c. 11 BC, ruled AD 41–44), client king of Judaea, called "King Herod" or "Herod" in Acts 12 of the New Testament
 Herod of Chalcis (died AD 48), also known as Herod II or Herod V, king of Chalcis (r. AD 41–48)
 Herod Agrippa II (born AD 27, ruled 48–c. 92), ruled Chalcis and described in Acts of the Apostles as "King Agrippa" before whom Paul the Apostle defended himself

Other 
 Herod, Illinois, United States
 Hérode et Mariamne, a tragedy by Voltaire
 Herods Run, a stream in West Virginia
 Herod (horse), a thoroughbred racehorse
 Herod (band), a heavy metal band from the United States
 Averitt-Herod House, historic house in Hartsville, Tennessee, U.S.
 Like Herod, a song by Scottish post-rock band Mogwai

See also
 Harrod (disambiguation)
 Herodes Atticus (AD 101–177), a Greek aristocrat not related to the Herodian Dynasty who served as a Roman senator and proponent of Sophism
 Herred, an administrative area in Denmark and Norway
 Herodian (disambiguation)
 Herrod (disambiguation)
 Orodes (disambiguation)